Groenten uit Balen may refer to:

 Groenten uit Balen (play), play by Walter van den Broeck
 Groenten uit Balen (film), 2011 Belgian film based on the play